Indrani is a Bengali romantic drama film directed by Niren Lahiri based on a story of Achintya Kumar Sengupta. This film was released in 1958 under the banner of H.N.C. Productions. Nachiketa Ghosh was the music director of the movie. The film starring Uttam Kumar and Suchitra Sen in lead role.

Plot
Indrani Mukherjee the only daughter of a staunch Brahmin in a village studies at Kolkata and stays in a girls' hostel. She meets Sudarshan Dutta, who had a brilliant career as a student and is doing his PhD. They fall in love, and Indrani wants to get married with him as soon as possible. She goes back to her village and informs her father of her intention to get married, Indrani's father takes umbrage as Sudarshan is not a Brahmin and also unemployed.

Sudarshan too warns Indrani that he won't be able to provide for her. Indrani marries Sudarshan and is tormented at Sudarshan's house by his mother and sisters in law because of several emotional strains at play. To avoid further complications at home, Indrani gets a job as a teacher in Dinajpur.

Their relationship between the newly married couple becomes complicated due to miscommunication or lack of communication between themselves, conflicting egos, misunderstandings and external elements adding fuel to the fire in an already charged emotional environment. One day, after a heated exchange between two people that started their journey fiercely loving and trusting one another, Sudarshan leaves Indrani and goes in search of a job elsewhere.

He there meets a retired teacher (Chhabi Biswas) with a dream of making a change in the lives of have-nots. They understand one another's aspirations and dream and team up to make a change by working in a remote village and improving its irrigation system by digging canal from a nearby river. News about his work and devotion gets published and he becomes famous.

Indrani is delighted to see the talent realized she always knew existed in Sudarshan (which is perhaps one of the reasons she fell in love with him)  and leaves everything, even her successful position at Dinajpur to join him, her love of life. Sudarshan, however, was still sore at the hurt he thought he received due to Indrani, and was slightly reluctant to accept her in his life again. It then took an accident of fire for both of them to realise how much they loved one another and how much they cared for each other.

Cast
 Uttam Kumar as Sudarshan Dutta
 Suchitra Sen as Indrani Mukherjee
Namita Sinha as Indrani's roommate at hostel
 Chhabi Biswas
 Tulsi Chakraborty
 Jiben Bose
 Shyam Laha
Tarun Kumar Chatterjee
Gangapada Basu
Chandrabati Devi  as Sudarshan Dutta's mother
Gita Dey as Sudarshan's second sister-in-law

Production
During the recording of the songs, composer Nachiketa Ghosh decided that he will include a Hindi song in the film, which he wished to be sung by legendary singer Mohammed Rafi. The idea seemed improbable at first because nobody was sure whether Rafi was going to sing in a Bengali film.

Eventually Hemant Kumar took the responsibility as he was already a big name in Bombay. He took Nachiketa to Rafi's house, who liked the tune instantly upon listening to it. But when he heard that only a maximum of five hundred rupees was possible for the playback, he hesitated. Then, as the duo were about to leave empty-handed, Rafi called them back and declared that he will render the song for free!

Soundtrack

Every song became very popular of this film , one of the main reasons of its success. This is the very first and last Bengali film where the legendary Hindi playback singer Md Rafi sung.

References

External links
 

1958 films
1958 romantic drama films
Bengali-language Indian films
Indian romantic drama films
Films based on Indian novels
1950s Bengali-language films